Escape to Danger is a 1943 British thriller film directed by Lance Comfort and Victor Hanbury and starring Eric Portman, Ann Dvorak and Karel Stepanek.

Plot
During the Second World War a British schoolteacher working in Denmark is caught up when the Germans invade.

Cast
 Eric Portman as Arthur Lawrence 
 Ann Dvorak as Joan Grahame 
 Karel Stepanek as Franz von Brinkman 
 Ronald Ward as Rupert Chessman 
 Ronald Adam as George Merrick 
 Felix Aylmer as Sir Alfred Horton 
 Brefni O'Rorke as Security Officer 
 A. E. Matthews as Sir Thomas Leighton 
 Ivor Barnard as Henry Waud 
 David Peel as Lt. Peter Leighton 
 Charles Victor as Petty Officer Flanagan 
 George Merritt as Works Manager 
 Marjorie Rhodes as Mrs. Pickles 
 John Ruddock as Jim 
 Frederick Cooper as Gösta

Critical reception
TV Guide wrote, "WW II espionage tale was timely for its day but has dated."

References

External links

1943 films
1940s spy thriller films
British spy thriller films
Films directed by Lance Comfort
Films directed by Victor Hanbury
Films set in Denmark
World War II films made in wartime
Films about Danish resistance movement
British black-and-white films
Films scored by William Alwyn
Films with screenplays by Jack Whittingham
Films with screenplays by Patrick Kirwan
1940s English-language films
1940s British films
English-language thriller films